Altes Amt Ebstorf is a former Samtgemeinde ("collective municipality") in the district of Uelzen, in Lower Saxony, Germany. Its seat was in the village Ebstorf. At the 1 November 2011 local government reform, the Samtgemeinden Bevensen and Altes Amt Ebstorf merged to form the new Samtgemeinde Bevensen-Ebstorf.

The Samtgemeinde Altes Amt Ebstorf consisted of the following municipalities:

 Ebstorf
 Hanstedt 
 Natendorf 
 Schwienau 
 Wriedel

References

External links 
  (German)

Former Samtgemeinden in Lower Saxony